Atli is an Old Norse masculine personal name, and may refer to:

People
 Atli the Slender, a 9th-century earl of Sogn, Norway
 Atli Viðar Björnsson (born 1980), Icelandic footballer
 Atli  Dam (1932–2005), five-time prime minister of the Faroe Islands
 Atli Gíslason (born 1947), Icelandic politician
 Atli Guðnason (born 1984), Icelandic footballer
 Atli Þór Héðinsson (born 1953), Icelandic former footballer
 Atli Örvarsson (born 1970), Icelandic film score composer
 Atli Heimir Sveinsson (born 1938), Icelandic composer

Fictional or mythological characters
 Atli, Attila in Old Norse legendary literature
 Atli, one of the names of the Norse god Thor
 Atli, in Helgakviða Hjörvarðssonar, a poem in the Poetic Edda
 Atli Buðlason, a character in the heroic poems in the Poetic Edda and in Völsunga saga, believed to be a romanticized version of Attila the Hun
 Atli, a character in Marvel comics
 Atli Hringsson
 Atli Iðmundsson

See also
 Atlı, a Turkish surname

Masculine given names